Language of a Broken Heart is a 2013 American romantic comedy film directed by Rocky Powell and written by and starring Juddy Talt.

Cast
Juddy Talt
Lara Pulver
Ethan Cohn
Kate French
Julie White
Oscar Nunez

Reception
The film has a 36% rating on Rotten Tomatoes.  Drew Hunt of Slant Magazine awarded the film half a star out of four.

The Fort Worth Star-Telegram gave the film a negative review and wrote, "Take 500 Days of Summer and Garden State, strip away their charms and you end up with Language of a Broken Heart, a handsomely shot but tired pile-up of indie rom-com cliches."

References

External links
 
 
 

American romantic comedy films
2013 romantic comedy films
2013 films
2010s English-language films
2010s American films